Hestia is the Greek goddess of the hearth.

Hestia may also refer to:
 Hestia Tobacco, American tobacco company
 46 Hestia, an asteroid
 Hestia (novel), a 1979 science fiction novel by C. J. Cherryh
 Hestia (character), a fictional character in the light novel series Is It Wrong to Try to Pick Up Girls in a Dungeon? and its derived works.
 Hestia, the "tenth planet" in the comic series Judge Dredd
 Hestia, an informal name used from 1955 to 1975 for Himalia, a moon of Jupiter.
 Hestia longifolia a plant species from Southeast Asia
 Hestia Jones, a minor Harry Potter character
 Hestia is the name of one of the Hesperides

See also
 The Hestia Tapestry, a 6th-century AD Byzantine tapestry
 Estia, a Greek newspaper